Garybaldi was an Italian progressive rock band founded in the early 1970s.

They were founded as Gleemen by guitarist Bambi Fossati and, apart from Fossati, they included Maurizio Cassinelli (drums and voice), Lio Marchi (keyboards) and Angelo Traverso (bass). Their first work was a cover of the Beatles' "Lady Madonna", followed by the LP Gleemen (1970). 

In 1971 they changed their name to Garybaldi, under which they published their first LP in 1971, entitled Nuda ("Naked"). Inspired by both Jimi Hendrix and rock progressive style, it featured a notable cover by artist Guido Crepax.

In 1973 Marchi and Traverso left, Sandro Serra entering as bassist. Under this new formation the band released their second LP, Astrolabio, where the rock progressive influence was more evident. The band broke up after its release.

In 1974 Fossati founded another band called Bambibanda e Melodie, featuring Cassinelli, bassist Roberto Ricci and percussionist Ramasandiran Somusundaram. The short-lived group released one album, Bambibanda e Melodie.

Garybaldi reformed in 1990 for the LP Bambi Fossati & Garybaldi, with Fossati, Cassinelli, Marco Mezzo (guitars) and Carlo Milan (bass). After another change of line-up, in 2000 they released another album, entitled La ragione e il torto, with a rock blues sound.

Discography
Gleemen
Gleemen (1970)
Garybaldi
Nuda (1972)
Astrolabio (1973)
Bambi Fossati & Garybaldi (1990) 
La ragione e il torto (2000) 
Note Perdute (2010)
Bambibanda e Melodie
Bambibanda e Melodie (1974)

Italian progressive rock groups